In pragmatics, a degreeting refers to the conversational procedure by which two participants of a conversation agree to discontinue the conversation. It is so named because a degreeting concludes a conversation in a similar way that a greeting engages one.

The following conversation is an example of degreeting:
Andrew: "I'll see you later then."
Bethany: "Yeah ok, see ya!"
Andrew: "Bye."

See also
Adjacency pair
Parting phrase

Pragmatics